Alborz Province (Ostān-e Alborz) is one of the 31 provinces of Iran. Karaj is the seat of the province, which is situated 10 km west of Tehran, at the foothills of the Alborz mountains. It is Iran's smallest province in area.

At the time of the 2006 National Census, the districts that were later to form the province had a population of 2,053,233. The first census after the creation of Alborz province counted 2,412,513 people in 2011. According to the National Census of 2016, the population had increased to 2,712,400 people, of whom 92.6% lived in urban areas. The majority of the population of Alborz identify as ethnic Persians.

Administrative divisions

Cities 
According to the 2016 census, 2,512,737 people (over 92% of the population of Alborz province) live in the following cities: Asara 1,339, Chaharbagh 48,828, Eshtehard 29,993, Fardis 181,174, Garmdarreh 22,726, Golsar 13,745, Hashtgerd 55,640, Kamal Shahr 141,669, Karaj 1,592,492, Kuhsar 10,940, Mahdasht 62,910, Meshkin Dasht 62,005, Mohammadshahr 119,418, Nazarabad 119,512, Shahr-e Jadid-e Hashtgerd 42,147, Taleqan 3,545, and Tankaman 4,654.

Transportation
 Metro: Tehran Metro is connected with Karaj through Line 5 (dark green). There are 3 metro stations in the province: Karaj, Mohammadshahr, and Golshahr. The other line from Golshahr to Hashtgerd for 25 kilometers long and has the capacity of transporting 250,000 passengers daily.
 Train: All trains that connect Tehran with the western parts of Iran and those that go to Turkey, pass through Karaj and most of them stop at Karaj railway station.
 Bus: Karaj is on Free Way 2, which connects Tehran and Tabriz.
 Shared Taxi: Several shared taxi (savari) stations offer the possibility to come from Tehran to different parts of Alborz province. The stations are located in Vanak, Tajrish, Enghelab, and Azadi. Their price varies from 40,000 to 50,000 rials, depending on their routes.

References

External links

 
Provinces of Iran
Alborz (mountain range)